Ingeborg Drewitz (born Ingeborg Neubert; 10 January 1923 – 26 November 1986) was a German writer and academic.

Life and career 
Drewitz was born in Berlin. She graduated in 1941 from the Königin-Luise-Schule in Berlin-Friedenau, and took a doctorate in German literature, history, and philosophy, on 20 April 1945, at the Friedrich-Wilhelm University (today's Humboldt University in Berlin). Her thesis was on German poet Erwin Guido Kolbenheyer.

From 1973 to 1980 she taught at the Institute of Journalism at the Free University of Berlin.  A year before her death she was a juror at the Ingeborg Bachmann Competition in Klagenfurt.

She married her childhood sweetheart, Bernhard Drewitz, by whom she had three daughters.  She died in Berlin, aged 63, of complications of cancer.

Writings 
As a writer, she was interested in the Enlightenment and addressed Germany's post-war history and the past and present social history of women.  According to Knaurs Lexikon der Weltliteratur ( "Knaur's Lexicon of World Literature"), third edition of 1995, she "made in her literary work, the abandonment of modern man and his inability to address his neighbour, as well as the problem of the individuality of life.  Problems in women and employment are at the heart of her work."

Her drama Alle Tore waren bewacht (All gates were guarded"), which premiered in 1955, was the first German play to address conditions in concentration camps.

Her most successful novel was Gestern war heute: Hundert Jahre Gegenwart (Yesterday was today: A hundred years of presence) (1978), that dealt with three generations of women in the 20th century. The novel is mandatory to read in 12th grade in Baden-Württemberg.

Novels 
 Der Anstoß. Bremen: Schünemann 1958
 Das Karussell. Göttingen: Sachse & Pohl 1969
 Oktoberlicht oder Ein Tag im Herbst. München: Nymphenburger 1969
 Wer verteidigt Katrin Lambert? Stuttgart: Werner Gebühr 1974
 Das Hochhaus. Stuttgart: Werner Gebühr 1975

 Gestern war heute: Hundert Jahre Gegenwart 1978

 Eis auf der Elbe. Tagebuchroman. Düsseldorf: Claassen 1982
 Eingeschlossen. Düsseldorf: Claassen 1986. NA: München: Goldmann TB 1988

Non-fiction 
 Die dichterische Darstellung ethischer Probleme im Werke Erwin Guido Kolbenheyers. Berlin: Univ. Diss. 1945
 Berliner Salons: Gesellschaft und Literatur zwischen Aufklärung und Industriezeitalter. Berlin: Haude & Spener, Schriftenreihe: Berlinische Reminiszenzen Bd. 7, 1965
 Leben und Werk von Adam Kuckhoff. Berlin: Friedenauer Presse, 1968
 Bettine von Arnim. Romantik – Revolution – Utopie. Biographie. Düsseldorf/Köln: Diederichs 1969 – Hildesheim: Claassen, 1992
 Zeitverdichtung: Essays, Kritiken, Portraits; gesammelt aus 2 Jahrzehnten. Wien/München/Zürich: Europaverlag, 1980
 Kurz vor 1984. Stuttgart: Radius-Verlag, 1981 
 Schrittweise Erkundung der Welt. Reise-Eindrücke. Wien u.a. : Europaverlag, 1982
 Unter meiner Zeitlupe. Porträts und Panoramen. Wien u.a. : Europaverlag, 1984
 Junge Menschen messen ihre Erwartungen aus, und die Messlatten stimmen nicht mehr – die Herausforderung: Tod. Stuttgart: Radius-Verlag, 1986

Honours

1963 Ernst Reuter Prize
1970 Georg Mackensen Literary Prize
1973 Federal Cross of Merit
1980 Ida-Dehmel-Literature Prize, Carl von Ossietzky Medal
1981 Gerrit Engelke Price
1983 Evangelischer Book Prize
1985 Hermann-Sinsheimer Prize

Street names
In the government quarter in Berlin-Mitte: Ingeborg-Drewitz-Allee
In Berlin-Steglitz: Ingeborg-Drewitz-Library
In Gladbeck: Ingeborg-Drewitz-Gesamtschule
In Freiburg: Ingeborg-Drewitz-Allee

Prize foundations
Ingeborg-Drewitz Literary Prize for prisoners
Ingeborg-Drewitz Prize for special commitment to human dignity

Sources
This article was translated from its equivalent in the German Wikipedia on 18 July 2009.
Bruges Gerhild man Rogers: Das Romanwerk von Ingeborg Drewitz. (Studies in modern German literature, Vol. 26) New York: Lang, 1989, 246 p. 
Titus Häussermann, Drewitz Bernhard (ed.): Ingeborg Drewitz: Materialien zu Werk und Wirken. Stuttgart: Radius-Verl., 1983, 160 p. 
Jutta Rosenkranz: Kurz-Porträt über die Schriftstellerin Ingeborg Drewitz. TV feature, ORB, 1998

References

External links

Drewitz at the University Library of the Free University of Berlin

1923 births
1986 deaths
Writers from Berlin
Officers Crosses of the Order of Merit of the Federal Republic of Germany
20th-century German women writers